The Indian Navy Swimmer Delivery Vehicle (SDV) is a planned class of midget submarine for the Indian navy. Under this programme the Indian Navy will acquire 2 midget submarines for use as Swimmer Delivery Vehicles.  These submarines will be used for conducting underwater special operations by MARCOS.  Both submarines will be constructed by Hindustan Shipyard Limited. The cost of procuring the two SDVs will be around ₹2,000 crore.

References 

Midget submarines
Submarines of the Indian Navy